Personal Internet Security 2011 is a scareware rogue anti-virus. It is a fake computer protection program that induces users to think that they have a number of viruses, when Personal Internet Security is in fact the virus itself. The program encourages users to pay a certain amount as a subscription to clean their computers and to "protect" their computers. The users will also notice that a different number of viruses are listed every time the virus pops up.

See also
 MS Antivirus (malware)

References

Scareware